The Middle Age of Mrs Eliot is a novel by Angus Wilson, first published in 1958. It won the James Tait Black Memorial Prize for that year, and has been regularly reprinted ever since.

It describes the fortunes of Meg Eliot, a happy and active woman, the wife of a barrister, who finds herself a widow in reduced circumstances after the shocking murder of her husband abroad.

Her attempts to rebuild her life are placed in contrast with the self-isolation of her brother, David, who lives with his dying partner Gordon at a commercial nursery in Sussex.

Wilson conceived the idea for the story in September 1957, while visiting Thailand, which is possibly the model for the fictional country of Badai.

The first edition dust jacket was designed by Michael Ayrton.

Characters
Meg Eliot
Bill Eliot, her husband
David Parker, her brother
The "lame ducks"
Polly Robson
Lady Pirie
Jill Stokes
Gordon Paget, David's partner
Else Bode
Mrs Paget, Gordon's mother
Lady Pirie
Michael Grant-Pritchard, a Tory MP
Fred Rogerson

Footnotes

1958 British novels
Novels by Angus Wilson
British LGBT novels
Novels set in Sussex
Secker & Warburg books